Annfield Plain is a village in County Durham, in England. It is situated on a plateau between the towns of Stanley,  to the north-east, and Consett,  to the west.  According to the 2001 census, Annfield Plain has a population of 3,569. By the time of the 2011 Census Annfield Plain had become a ward of Stanley parish. The ward had a population of 10,012.  Along with much of the surrounding area, Annfield Plain's history lies in coal mining. While the industry collapsed in the 1980s and 90s, its effects are still apparent both in the landscape and in folk memory.

Much of the surrounding landscape is rough moorland, dominated by the nearby Pontop Pike television mast.

Name
"Anfield", as the name was originally appears to derive from "the fields of An", referring to a man who lived before the Norman Conquest. The "Plain" part of the name was originally "Plane" and appears to refer originally not to the plateau on which the village stands but to the inclined plane on the Stanhope and Tyne Railway of 1834. The engine used by the plane was known as the Anfield Engine because of its proximity to Anfield House, built in the 18th century on nearby Loud Hill. The spelling changed to "Annfield Plain" around 1856, when houses were built for miners on the nearby plateau.

History
The earliest hard evidence of habitation in the area comes from the 16th century, when the main economic activity was sheep farming. The village's association with mining begins in the late 17th century when many shallow mines were dug. The Stanhope and Tyne Railway, laid in 1834, assisted the transportation of coal. Several limekilns were built at this time and were fuelled by local coal, with limestone being brought in by rail.

Demand for coal increased with the advent of the Industrial Revolution, and a number of deep pits were sunk over the course of the 19th century. The village grew substantially and light industry increased, including the construction of a brewery, mill, and candle factory; as well as various services for the population, including a school, church, at least two nonconformist chapels, and a variety of shops.

In the 19th century Annfield Plain was the scene of a murder, when a man named William Thompson killed his wife. He was hanged at Durham prison on 5 January 1874.³

Annfield Plain Golf Club (now defunct) was founded in 1907. The club closed in 1931.

Present day

While there is some light industry, most of Annfield Plain is made up of housing, village shops and several pubs. The local Tesco (formally Co-operative) Co-op supermarket was commonly known as the Disco, an allusion to its former name: the Annfield Plain Co-op and Discount Electricals. The supermarket was converted to a Tesco store in October 2007. The original Annfield Plain co-operative store was dismantled and rebuilt at the nearby Beamish Open Air Museum in the late 1980s. The site of the village's main pit, the Busty, is now a privately owned coach garage.

Its proximity to the major centres of the North East of England has in recent years attracted residents from Newcastle and Gateshead to move out to escape the city. This has had the consequence of pushing up house prices, long among the cheapest in Britain, which had been both a boon and burden to locals.

Geography

Administration
Annfield Plain is located in the County Durham unitary authority area. It is represented on Durham County Council by Michele Hodgson and Thomas Nearney (both Labour). The village is part of the North Durham parliamentary constituency, which as of 2005 is represented in parliament by Kevan Jones (Labour). It is in the North East England region, which serves as a constituency for the European Parliament.

The local police force is Durham Constabulary. Annfield Plain is in the Derwentside division and its nearest police station is in Catchgate

Location
 Elevation: 250 m (850 ft)
 Road access: A693 between Stanley and Consett, and numerous minor roads
 Rail access: Chester-le-Street,  by road

Nearby places

Surrounding Annfield Plain and effectively joined to it are several other villages:
 Greencroft to the west
 New Kyo to the east
 West Kyo and Catchgate to the north

Notable people
 Alun Armstrong - original cast member of Les Misérables, playing Monsieur Thénardier. Also in New Tricks and The Mummy Returns
 Tom Lamb - former miner who became an artist, depicting the scenes of underground life for miners
 Joseph Crawford - President of the Trades Union Congress and General Secretary of the National Association of Colliery Overmen, Deputies and Shotfirers
 Glenn McCrory - former Cruiserweight World Champion boxer
 Micky Horswill- former footballer

See also
Annfield Plain F.C.

References

 Hatcher, Jane. "Annfield Plain—a short history". Durham Miner Project. Retrieved 11 January 2005.
 Durham County Council & Northumberland County Council. " Local History: Annfield Plain (County Durham)". Keys to the Past. Retrieved 11 January 2005.
 Mills, Alistair (2004). "Executions at Durham, 1732–1909". GENUKI. Retrieved 11 January 2005.

External links

Villages in County Durham
Stanley, County Durham